Harry Catto (February 2, 1865 – February 5, 1912) was an American Negro league outfielder in the 1880s and 1890s.

A native of Bordentown, New Jersey, Catto played for the Cuban Giants in 1887, 1888, and 1891. He died in St. Augustine, Florida in 1912 at age 47.

References

External links
Baseball statistics and player information from Baseball-Reference Black Baseball Stats and Seamheads

1865 births
1912 deaths
Cuban Giants players
Baseball outfielders
Baseball players from New Jersey
People from Bordentown, New Jersey